Teufelsberg is German for "Devil's Mountain" or "Devil's Hill" and may refer to:

 places in Germany:
 Teufelsberg, a low hill in Berlin
 Teufelsberg (Palatinate), a hill in the Palatine Forest, Rhineland-Palatinate
 Teufelsberg (Rhön), a hill in the Rhön Mountains, Bavaria and Hesse
 Teufelsberg, a hillock in the northeast of the Aubinger Lohe, the site of Aubing Castle
 Teufelsberg (Altomünster), a village in the market borough of Altomünster, Dachau county, Bavaria
 a section of the route on the endurosport event Rund um Zschopau in Scharfenstein
 in Czech Republic:
 the German name for the North Bohemian hill of Malý Bezděz
 the German name for the hill of Čertová hora in the Giant Mountains 
 in Namibia:
 Teufelsberg (Namibia), a hill in Africa

See also 
Devil's Mountain (disambiguation)
Devil's Peak (disambiguation)